EFU may refer to:

Egyptian Feminist Union, the first nationwide feminist movement in Egypt
Sixpack (European Union law), A fiscal law in the European Union
European Fiscal Compact, An intergovernmental budget treaty in the European Union
 Exclusive Farm Use, a land use designation in the U.S. state of Oregon
EFU Group, a Pakistan-based insurance company
 EFU tornado, a category on the Enhanced Fujita scale indicating a tornado of unknown intensity